The time period of around 1985–1991 marked the final period of the Cold War. It was characterized by systemic reform within the Soviet Union, the easing of geopolitical tensions between the Soviet-led bloc and the United States-led bloc, and the collapse of the Soviet Union's influence in Eastern Europe, and the dissolution of  the Soviet Union.

The beginning of this period is marked by the ascendancy of Mikhail Gorbachev to the position of General Secretary of the Communist Party of the Soviet Union. Seeking to bring an end to the economic stagnation associated with the Brezhnev Era, Gorbachev initiated economic reforms (perestroika), and political liberalization (glasnost). While the exact end date of the Cold War is debated among historians, it is generally agreed upon that the implementation of nuclear and conventional arms control agreements, the withdrawal of Soviet military forces from Afghanistan and Eastern Europe, and the collapse of the Soviet Union marked the end of the Cold War.

Thaw in relations

After the deaths of three successive elderly Soviet leaders since 1982, the Soviet Politburo elected Gorbachev Communist Party General Secretary in March 1985, marking the rise of a new generation of leadership. Under Gorbachev, relatively young reform-oriented technocrats, who had begun their careers in the heyday of "de-Stalinization" under reformist leader Nikita Khrushchev, rapidly consolidated power, providing new momentum for political and economic liberalization, and the impetus for cultivating warmer relations and trade with the West.

On the Western front, President Reagan's administration had taken a hard line against the Soviet Union. Under the Reagan Doctrine, the Reagan administration began providing military support to anti-communist armed movements in Afghanistan, Angola, Nicaragua and elsewhere.

A major breakthrough came in 1985–87, with the successful negotiation of the Intermediate-Range Nuclear Forces Treaty (INF). The treaty did not cover sea-launched missiles. By May 1991, after on-site investigations by both sides, 2,700 missiles had been destroyed.

The Reagan administration also persuaded the Saudi Arabian oil companies to increase oil production. This led to a three-times drop in the prices of oil, and oil was the main source of Soviet export revenues. Following the USSR's previous large military buildup, President Reagan ordered an enormous peacetime defense buildup of the United States Armed Forces; the Soviets did not respond to this by building up their military because the military expenses, in combination with collectivized agriculture in the nation, and inefficient planned manufacturing, would cause a heavy burden for the Soviet economy. It was already stagnant and in a poor state prior to the tenure of Mikhail Gorbachev who, despite significant attempts at reform, was unable to revitalise the economy. In 1985, Reagan and Gorbachev held their first of four "summit" meetings, this one in Geneva, Switzerland. After discussing policy, facts, etc., Reagan invited Gorbachev to go with him to a small house near the beach. The two leaders spoke in that house well over their time limit, but came out with the news that they had planned two more (soon three more) summits.

The second summit took place the following year, in 1986 on October 11, in Reykjavík, Iceland. The meeting was held to pursue discussions about scaling back their intermediate-range ballistic missile arsenals in Europe. The talks came close to achieving an overall breakthrough on nuclear arms control, but ended in failure due to Reagan's proposed Strategic Defense Initiative and Gorbachev's proposed cancellation of it. Nonetheless, cooperation continued to increase and, where it failed, Gorbachev reduced some strategic arms unilaterally.

Fundamental to the dissolution of the Soviet Union, the Gorbachev policy initiatives of Restructuring (Perestroika) and Openness (Glasnost) had ripple effects throughout the Soviet world, including eventually making it impossible to reassert central control over Warsaw Pact member states without resorting to military force.

On June 12, 1987, Reagan challenged Gorbachev to go further with his reforms and democratization by tearing down the Berlin Wall. In a speech at the Brandenburg Gate next to the wall, Reagan stated:

While the aging communist European leaders kept their states in the grip of "normalization", Gorbachev's reformist policies in the Soviet Union exposed how a once revolutionary Communist Party of the Soviet Union had become moribund at the very center of the system. Facing declining revenues due to declining oil prices and rising expenditures related to the arms race and the command economy, the Soviet Union was forced during the 1980s to take on significant amounts of debt from the Western banking sector. The growing public disapproval of the Soviet–Afghan War, and the socio-political effects of the Chernobyl accident in Ukraine increased public support for these policies. By the spring of 1989, the USSR had not only experienced lively media debate, but had also held its first multi-candidate elections. For the first time in recent history, the force of liberalization was spreading from West to East.

Revolt spreads through Communist Europe

Grassroots organizations, such as Poland's Solidarity movement, rapidly gained ground with strong popular bases. In February 1989 the Polish People's Republic opened talks with opposition, known as the Polish Round Table Agreement, which allowed elections with participation of anti-Communist parties in June 1989.

The initially inconspicuous opening of a border gate of the Iron Curtain between Austria and Hungary in August 1989 then triggered a chain reaction, at the end of which the German Democratic Republic no longer existed and the Eastern Bloc had disintegrated. The idea for the Pan-European Picnic came from Otto von Habsburg and was intended as a test of whether the Soviet Union would react when the iron curtain was opened. The Pan-European Union Austria then advertised with leaflets in Hungary to make East Germans aware of the possibility of escape. The result of the greatest mass exodus since the building of the Berlin Wall and the non-reaction of the Eastern bloc states showed the oppressed population that their governments had lost absolute power. Subsequently, large numbers of East German refugees attempted to flee through Hungary and the weak reactions showed that the communist leaders lost even more power.

Also in 1989 the Communist government in Hungary started to negotiate organizing of competitive elections which took place in 1990. In Czechoslovakia and East Germany, mass protests unseated entrenched Communist leaders. The Communist regimes in Bulgaria and Romania also crumbled, in the latter case as the result of a violent uprising. Attitudes had changed enough that US Secretary of State James Baker suggested that the American government would not be opposed to Soviet intervention in Romania, on behalf of the opposition, to prevent bloodshed. The tidal wave of change culminated with the fall of the Berlin Wall in November 1989, which symbolized the collapse of European Communist governments and graphically ended the Iron Curtain divide of Europe.

The collapse of the Eastern European governments with Gorbachev's tacit consent inadvertently encouraged several Soviet republics to seek greater independence from Moscow's rule. Agitation for independence in the Baltic states led to first Lithuania, and then Estonia and Latvia, declaring their independence. Disaffection in the other republics was met by promises of greater decentralization. More open elections led to the election of candidates opposed to Communist Party rule.

In an attempt to halt the rapid changes to the system, a group of Soviet hard-liners represented by Vice-president Gennady Yanayev launched a coup overthrowing Gorbachev in August 1991. Russian President Boris Yeltsin rallied the people and much of the army against the coup and the effort collapsed. Although restored to power, Gorbachev's authority had been irreparably undermined. In September, the Baltic states were granted independence. On December 1, Ukraine withdrew from the USSR. On December 26, 1991, the USSR officially dissolved, breaking up into fifteen separate nations.

End of the Cold War 
After the end of the Revolutions of 1989, Gorbachev and President Bush Sr. met on the neutral island of Malta to discuss the events of the year, the withdrawal of the Soviet military from Eastern Europe, and the future course of their relationship. After their discussions, the two leaders publicly announced they would work together for German reunification, the normalization of relations, the resolution of Third World conflicts, and the promotion of peace and democracy (referred to by President Bush as a "New World Order".)

Between the Malta Summit and the Dissolution of the Soviet Union negotiations on several arms control agreements began, resulting in agreements such as START I and the Chemical Weapons Convention. Additionally, the United States, still believing the Soviet Union would continue to exist in the long term, began to take steps to create a positive long-term relationship.

This new relationship was demonstrated by the joint American-Soviet opposition to Iraq's invasion of Kuwait. The Soviet Union voted in the United Nations Security Council in favor of Resolution 678 authorizing the use of military force against its former Middle Eastern ally.

Several conflicts in third world nations (i.e. Cambodia, Angola, Nicaragua) related to the Cold War would come to an end during this era of cooperation, with both the Soviet Union and the United States working together to pressure their respective proxies to make peace with one another. Overall, this détente which accompanied the final twilight of the Cold War would help bring about a relatively more peaceful world.

As a consequence of the Revolutions of 1989 and the adoption of a foreign policy based on non-interference by the Soviet Union, the Warsaw Pact was dissolved and Soviet troops began withdrawing back to the Soviet Union, completing their withdrawal by the mid-1990s.

The United States had established a complex global presence by the 1990s and policymakers felt that some structure to explain the "threats, interests and priories" that guide foreign policy was needed, but there was no agreement how to proceed. Anthony Lake has said that attempts at doctrine making during this period risked introducing "neo-know-nothing" isolationism or what he termed "irrational" ideas. The goal then of Bush Sr. and Clinton during their terms in office was to develop foreign policy objectives that would support consensus rather than accelerate fragmentation inside America's sphere of influence.

Causes 
Scholars have pointed to materialist and ideational reasons for the end of the Cold War. Materialists emphasize Soviet economic difficulties (such as economic stagnation and sovereign debt), whereas ideationalists argue that the worldviews and personas of Gorbachev and Reagan mattered. Ideationalists point to a Gorbachev and Reagan's mutual desire to abolish nuclear weapons, as well as Gorbachev's perceptions of the legitimate ends and means of foreign policy.

Legacy

Countries such as the Czech Republic, Estonia, Hungary, Latvia, Lithuania, Poland, and Slovakia experienced economic reconstruction, growth and fast integration with EU and NATO while some of their eastern neighbors created hybrids of free market oligarchy system, post-communist corrupted administration and dictatorship.

Russia and some other Soviet successor states faced a chaotic and harsh transition from a command economy to free market capitalism following the dissolution of the Soviet Union. A large percentage of the population lived in poverty,  GDP growth declined, and life expectancy dropped sharply. Living conditions also declined in some other parts of the former Eastern bloc.

The post–Cold War era saw a period of unprecedented prosperity in the West, especially in the United States, and a wave of democratization throughout Latin America, Africa, and Central, South-East and Eastern Europe.

Sociologist Immanuel Wallerstein expresses a less triumphalist view, arguing that the end of the Cold War is a prelude to the breakdown of Pax Americana. In his essay "Pax Americana is Over," Wallerstein argues, “The collapse of communism in effect signified the collapse of liberalism, removing the only ideological justification behind US hegemony, a justification tacitly supported by liberalism’s ostensible ideological opponent.”

Space exploration has petered out in both the United States and Russia without the competitive pressure of the space race. Military decorations have become more common, as they were created, and bestowed, by the major powers during the near 50 years of undeclared hostilities.

Timeline of related events

1985 

January 20, 1985 – Ronald Reagan is sworn in for a second term as President of the United States
March 10, 1985 – General Secretary of the Communist Party of the Soviet Union Konstantin Chernenko dies
March 11, 1985 – Soviet Politburo member Mikhail Gorbachev becomes the General Secretary of the Communist Party
March 24, 1985 – Major Arthur D. Nicholson, a US Army Military Intelligence officer is shot to death by a Soviet sentry in East Germany. He is listed as the last US casualty in the Cold War.

1986 

February 22–25, 1986 - People Power Revolution successfully overthrows Ferdinand Marcos in the Philippines
April 26, 1986 - The Chernobyl Disaster

1987 

January 1987 – Gorbachev introduces the policy of demokratizatsiya in the Soviet Union
January 27, 1987 – The United States recognizes the independence of Mongolia and establishes diplomatic relations.
March 4, 1987 – In a televised address, Reagan takes full responsibility for the Iran–Contra affair.
June 12, 1987 – "Tear down this wall" speech by Reagan in West Berlin
June 29, 1987 – June Struggle in South Korea
July 15, 1987 – The Republic of China ends 38 years of martial law
November 15, 1987 – Brașov rebellion in Romania
December 8, 1987 – The Intermediate-Range Nuclear Forces Treaty is signed in Washington, D.C.

1988 

February 12, 1988 – Hostile rendezvous off coast of Crimea in Black Sea when the Soviet frigate Bezzavetnyy rammed the American missile cruiser USS Yorktown
February 20, 1988 – The regional soviet of Nagorno-Karabakh in Azerbaijan decides to be part of Armenia, but the Kremlin refuses to do it. The subsequent First Nagorno-Karabakh War would be the first of the internal conflicts in the Soviet Union that would become the post-Soviet separatist conflicts.
August 8, 1988 – 8888 Uprising in Burma
August 17, 1988 – Pakistani president Muhammad Zia-ul-Haq dies
August 20, 1988 – End of Iran–Iraq War
September 17, 1988 – Summer Olympics in Seoul, South Korea; first time since 1976 that both Soviet Union and the United States participate; it is also the last Olympic Games for the Soviet Union and its satellite states
October 5, 1988 – Chilean dictator Augusto Pinochet is defeated in a nationwide referendum
December 21, 1988 - Pan Am Flight 103 bombing

1989 

January 7, 1989 - Japanese Emperor Hirohito dies, he was succeeded by his son Akihito.
January 20, 1989 – George H. W. Bush becomes president of the United States
February 1989 – End of Soviet–Afghan War; continuation of internal conflict without Soviet troops
June 3, 1989 – Iranian leader Ayatollah Khomeini dies
June 4, 1989 – Tiananmen Square protests of 1989 in Beijing, People's Republic of China
June 4, 1989 – Solidarity's decisive victory in the first partially free parliamentary elections in post-war Poland sparks off a succession of anti-communist Revolutions of 1989 across Central, later South-East and Eastern Europe
August 14, 1989 – South African president Pieter Willem Botha resigns in reaction to the implementation of Tripartite Accord
August 19, 1989 – The opening of the border gate between Austria and Hungary at the Pan-European Picnic set in motion a chain reaction, at the end of which there was no longer a GDR and the Eastern Bloc had disintegrated
August 23, 1989 – Soviet Politburo member Alexander Yakovlev denounces the secret protocols of the Hitler-Stalin Pact
August 24, 1989 – Tadeusz Mazowiecki becomes the Prime Minister of Poland forming the first non-communist government in the Communist bloc
October 23, 1989 – End of Communism in Hungary
November 9, 1989 – Fall of the Berlin Wall
November 24, 1989 – Communist Party of Czechoslovakia leaders resign during the Velvet Revolution, effectively ending one-party rule in that country
December 2–3, 1989 – Malta Summit between Bush and Gorbachev, who said, "I assured the President of the United States that I will never start a hot war against the USA."
December 10, 1989 – Czechoslovak President Gustáv Husák's resignation amounted to the fall of the Communist regime in Czechoslovakia, leaving Ceaușescu's Romania as the only remaining hard-line Communist regime in the Warsaw Pact. 
December 25, 1989 – Execution of Nicolae Ceauşescu during the Romanian Revolution against Communist Party rule
December 29, 1989 – Václav Havel assumes the presidency of Czechoslovakia at the conclusion of Velvet Revolution
December 30, 1989 – The Securitate, the secret police of Romania, is dissolved.

1990 

January 13, 1990 – The Stasi, the secret police of East Germany, is dissolved.
January 22, 1990 - the League of Communists of Yugoslavia, the ruling party of the Socialist Federal Republic of Yugoslavia, is dissolved during its congress, ending the one party system in the country.
February 1, 1990 – StB, the secret police of Czechoslovakia is dissolved.
March 15, 1990 – Inauguration of Gorbachev as the first President of the Soviet Union
April 12, 1990 - The Socialist Republic of Slovenia within Yugoslavia holds its first multi-party elections
April 22–23 and May 6–7, 1990 - the Socialist Republic of Croatia within Yugoslavia holds its first multi-party elections
April 25, 1990 – Violeta Chamorro is sworn in as president of Nicaragua, ending the Sandinista rule and the Contras insurgency
May 22, 1990 – South and North Yemens are unified
June 8, 1990 - the Message from Turnberry, described as the "first official recognition of the end of the Cold War", is issued
July 5–6, 1990 – NATO holds its 11th summit in London.
July 13, 1990 – The 28th Congress of the Communist Party of the Soviet Union announces the end of its monopoly of power
August 2, 1990 – Beginning of Gulf War
September 9, 1990 – Helsinki Summit between Bush and Gorbachev
September 12, 1990 – The Treaty on the Final Settlement with Respect to Germany is signed in Moscow
October 3, 1990 – Official reunification of Germany
November 6, 1990 – Hungary become the first Soviet Bloc country to join the Council of Europe
November 11, 1990 - The Socialist Republic of Macedonia within Yugoslavia holds its first multi-party elections
November 18, 1990 - The Socialist Republic of Bosnia and Herzegovina within Yugoslavia holds its first multiparty elections
November 19, 1990 – NATO and Warsaw Pact sign the Treaty on Conventional Armed Forces in Europe
November 28, 1990 – Margaret Thatcher falls from power as UK Prime Minister; John Major takes office
December 9, 1990 - The Socialist Republic of Montenegro within Yugoslavia holds its first multi-party elections
December 9–23, 1990 - The Socialist Republic of Serbia within Yugoslavia holds its first multi-party elections
December 22, 1990 – Lech Wałęsa becomes president of Poland; Polish government-in-exile ends
December 23, 1990 - Slovenia holds an independence referendum resulting in a majority of Slovenians voting in favour of Slovenia seeking independence from Yugoslavia

1991 

January 1991 – Money transfers from the Czech Republic budget to the Slovak Republic are stopped, beginning the process that would lead to Velvet Divorce
February 28, 1991 – End of Gulf War
March 3, 1991 – Estonia and Latvia hold an independence referendum with a majority voting to restore independence.
March 31, 1991 – Georgia holds an independence referendum resulting in a majority of Georgians voting in favour of Georgia becoming independent from the Soviet Union.
May 1, 1991 – The Republic of China abolishes the Temporary Provisions against the Communist Rebellion which was in place during the Chinese Civil War 
May 19, 1991 - Croatia holds an independence referendum resulting in a majority of Croatians voting in favour of Croatia seeking independence from Yugoslavia
May 29, 1991 – End of Eritrean War of Independence in Ethiopia
June 27, 1991 – Beginning of the Yugoslav Wars in Slovenia
June 28, 1991 – Comecon is dissolved.
July 1, 1991 – The Warsaw Pact is dissolved.
July 10, 1991 – Boris Yeltsin becomes president of Russia
July 31, 1991 – Ratification of START I treaty between United States and the Soviet Union
August 19, 1991 – Start of the Soviet Union coup d'état attempt
August 21, 1991 – The Soviet Union coup d'état is dissolved.
August 24, 1991 – Gorbachev resigns from the post of General Secretary of the Communist Party of the Soviet Union
September 6, 1991 – The Soviet Union recognizes the independence of the Baltic States
September 8, 1991 - The Republic of Macedonia holds an independence referendum resulting in a majority of Macedonians voting in favour of Macedonia seeking independence from Yugoslavia
September 21, 1991 – Armenia holds an independence referendum resulting in a majority of Armenians voting in favour of Armenia becoming independent from the Soviet Union.
October 26, 1991 – Turkmenistan holds an independence referendum resulting in a majority of voting in favour of Turkmenistan becoming independent of the Soviet Union.
November 6, 1991 – The Communist Party of the Soviet Union and the Soviet KGB are dissolved.
November 7–8, 1991 – NATO holds its 12th summit in Rome.
December 8, 1991 – The Belavezha Accords are signed by the leaders of Russian Soviet Federative Socialist Republic, Ukrainian Soviet Socialist Republic and Byelorussian Soviet Socialist Republic, sealing the dissolution of the Soviet Union and the creation of CIS
December 25, 1991 – Gorbachev resigns as President of the Soviet Union and the post is abolished; the red Soviet flag is lowered from the Moscow Kremlin, and in its place the flag of the Russian Federation is raised.
December 26, 1991 – The Supreme Soviet dissolves the Soviet Union.

See also
History of the Soviet Union (1982–1991)
History of the United States (1980–1991)
Post-Communism
Reagan Doctrine
Solidarity
Timeline of events in the Cold War

Footnotes

Further reading
Ball, S. J. The Cold War: An International History, 1947–1991 (1998). British perspective
Beschloss, Michael, and Strobe Talbott. At the Highest Levels:The Inside Story of the End of the Cold War (1993)
 Braithwaite, Rodric et al. "Could the Soviet Union Have Survived? We ask four historians whether the demise of one of the 20th century's superpowers was as inevitable as it now seems." History Today (Oct 2020) 70#10 pp 8–10 [online].
 Brooks, Stephen G., and William C. Wohlforth. "Power, globalization, and the end of the Cold War: Reevaluating a landmark case for ideas." International Security 25.3 (2001): 5-53.  [online]
 Engel, Jeffrey A. When the World Seemed New: George H. W. Bush and the End of the Cold War (2017)
 Gaddis, John Lewis. The Cold War: A New History (2005) online
 Gaddis, John Lewis. The United States and the End of the Cold War: Implications, Reconsiderations, Provocations (1992) online
 Garthoff, Raymond. The Great Transition: American-Soviet Relations and the End of the Cold War (1994) online
 Goertz, Gary and Jack S. Levy, eds. Causal explanations, necessary conditions, and case studies: World War I and the End of the Cold War (2005), 10 essays from political scientists; online
 Hogan, Michael, ed. The End of the Cold War. Its Meaning and Implications (1992) articles from Diplomatic History 
 Kalinovsky, Artemy M. "New Histories of the End of the Cold War and the Late Twentieth Century." Contemporary European History 27.1 (2018): 149–161. online
 Kegley Jr, Charles W. "How did the cold war die? Principles for an autopsy." Mershon International Studies Review 38.Supplement_1 (1994): 11–41.
 Kenney, Padraic. 1989: Democratic Revolutions at the Cold War's End: A Brief History with Documents (2009) covers Poland, the Philippines, Chile, South Africa, Ukraine, and China
 Leffler, Melvyn P. For the Soul of Mankind: The United States, the Soviet Union, and the Cold War (2007) pp 338–450.
 Mann, James. The Rebellion of Ronald Reagan: A History of the End of the Cold War (2010). popular
 Matlock, Jack F. Autopsy on an Empire (1995) online by US ambassador to Moscow
 Matlock, Jack F. Reagan and Gorbachev : how the Cold War ended (2004) online
 Powaski, Ronald E. The Cold War: The United States and the Soviet Union, 1917–1991 (1998)
 Romero, Federico. "Cold War historiography at the crossroads." Cold War History 14.4 (2014): 685–703. online
Shultz, George P. Turmoil and Triumph: My Years as Secretary of State (1993), a primary source
 Westad, Odd Arne. The Cold War: A World History (2017) pp 527–629
Wilson, James Graham. The Triumph of Improvisation: Gorbachev's Adaptability, Reagan's Engagement, and the End of the Cold War (2014)
 Wohlforth, William C. "Realism and the End of the Cold War." International Security 19.3 (1994): 91–129. online
 Zubok, Vladislav M.  "Gorbachev and the End of the Cold War: Perspectives on History and Personality," Cold War History (2002)  2:2, 61–100, DOI: 10.1080/713999954
 Zubok, Vladislav M. A failed empire: the Soviet Union in the Cold War from Stalin to Gorbachev (2009). online

External links
Cold War International History Project: The End of the Cold War
Cold War Files: The End of the Cold War
Jeffrey W. Knopf "Did Reagan Win the Cold War?"
Cold War Air Museum: Aircraft from this period of the Cold War

Cold War by period
1985 in international relations
1986 in international relations
1987 in international relations
1988 in international relations
1989 in international relations
1990 in international relations
1991 in international relations
Articles containing video clips